Alexis Tohani Coronado Valenzuela (born January 10, 1997) is a Mexican professional footballer who plays as a midfielder.

References

1997 births
Living people
Sportspeople from Hermosillo
Footballers from Sonora
Mexican footballers
Association football midfielders
Cimarrones de Sonora players
Ascenso MX players
Liga Premier de México players
Tercera División de México players
21st-century Mexican people